A mill dam (International English) or milldam (US) is a dam constructed on a waterway to create a mill pond.

Water passing through a dam's spillway is used to turn a water wheel and provide energy to the many varieties of watermill.  By raising the water level so that the overflow has farther to fall, a milldam increases the potential energy that a mill can harness and use for various tasks.

Examples

Listed are here are some of the many examples of historic milldams and millponds (or place names taken from them).

Examples in the United Kingdom include:
Bramley Millpond in Bramley, Surrey
Ifield Millpond in Ifield, West Sussex
Valebridge Millpond on the outskirts of Burgess Hill, West Sussex
Mill Dam, Shapinsay in the Orkney Islands

Examples in the United States include:
Milldam Rice Mill and Rice Barn in Georgetown County, South Carolina
Atwater Millpond in Kalamazoo County, Michigan
Ballardvale Millpond in Ballardvale, Massachusetts
Bigler's Millpond in Bigler's Mill, Virginia
Crump's Millpond in Quinton, Virginia
Gardy's Millpond in Westmoreland and Northumberland County, Virginia
Glovers Millpond in Glascock County, Georgia
Goodrich Millpond in Genesee County, Michigan
Goodwin's Millpond in Marlboro County, South Carolina
Hands Millpond in Cape May County, New Jersey
Merchants Millpond State Park in Gates County, North Carolina
Millpond, a small lake in Butler, New York
Millpond Acres in Sussex County, Delaware
Millpond Park in Mount Pleasant, Michigan
Millpond Plantation in Thomas County, Georgia
Millpond Reservoir in Burlington, Massachusetts

References 

Dams
Watermills

de:Mühlenstau